Frederick Graham Moloney (August 4, 1882 in Ottawa, Illinois – December 24, 1941 in Chicago, Illinois) was an American athlete who competed in the early twentieth century. He specialized in the 110 metre hurdles and won a bronze medal in Athletics at the 1900 Summer Olympics in Paris with a time of 15.6 seconds. John McLean took silver with a time of 15.5 seconds.

Moloney also competed in the 100 metres event, placing second in his first-round heat, third in his semifinal, and in the bottom half of the repechage to finish between 7th and 9th overall. In the 200 metre hurdles, he finished third in his semifinal heat and did not advance to the final.

His brother William also competed in the 1900 Olympics.

References

External links 

 De Wael, Herman. Herman's Full Olympians: "Athletics 1900". Accessed 18 March 2006.
 

1882 births
1941 deaths
American male hurdlers
Athletes (track and field) at the 1900 Summer Olympics
Olympic bronze medalists for the United States in track and field
Medalists at the 1900 Summer Olympics
People from Ottawa, Illinois
Track and field athletes from Illinois
University of Chicago alumni